Andrea Čanađija  (née Čović; born 9 October 1993) is a retired Croatian handballer who was last played for HC Vardar and the Croatian national team.

International honours
EHF Champions League:
Bronze Medalist: 2016

References

1993 births
Living people
People from Sinj
Croatian female handball players
Expatriate handball players
Croatian expatriate sportspeople in North Macedonia
Mediterranean Games medalists in handball
Mediterranean Games bronze medalists for Croatia
Competitors at the 2013 Mediterranean Games
RK Podravka Koprivnica players
21st-century Croatian women
20th-century Croatian women